Highway 10 is an Iraqi highway which extends from Al Rutbah to the  Jordan frontier.

Roads in Iraq